Macrinus is a genus of huntsman spiders that was first described by Eugène Louis Simon in 1887.

Species
 it contains six species, found in South America, the United States, and on Tobago:
Macrinus bambuco Rheims, 2010 – Colombia
Macrinus calypso Rheims, 2010 – Tobago
Macrinus jaegeri Rheims, 2007 – Brazil
Macrinus mohavensis (Fox, 1937) – USA
Macrinus pollexensis (Schenkel, 1953) – Venezuela, Brazil
Macrinus succineus Simon, 1887 (type) – Ecuador to Brazil

See also
 List of Sparassidae species

References

Araneomorphae genera
Sparassidae
Spiders of North America
Spiders of South America